SM UC-92 was a German Type UC III minelaying submarine or U-boat in the German Imperial Navy during World War I.

Design
A German Type UC III submarine, UC-92 had a displacement of  when at the surface and  while submerged. The submarine was powered by two six-cylinder four-stroke diesel engines each producing  (a total of ), two electric motors producing , and two propeller shafts.

UC-92 was fitted with six  mine tubes, fourteen UC 200 mines, three  torpedo tubes (one on the stern and two on the bow), seven torpedoes, and one  SK L/45 or  Uk L/30 deck gun. Her complement was twenty-six crew members.

Construction, career and demise
The U-boat was ordered on 12 January 1916 and was launched on 19 January 1918. She was commissioned into the German Imperial Navy on 14 August 1918 as SM UC-92. As with the rest of the completed UC III boats, UC-92 conducted no war patrols and sank no ships. She was surrendered on 24 November 1918.

Later, UC-92 was towed to Falmouth along with five other U-boats  for use in a series of explosive test trials by the Royal Navy in Falmouth Bay, in order to find weaknesses in their design. Following her use on 7 March 1921, UC-92 was dumped on Castle Beach and sold to R. Roskelly & Rodgers on 19 April 1921 for scrap, and partially salvaged over the following decades, with some efforts noted as late as the 1960s. In 2013, Wessex Archaeology, assisted by local divers with knowledge of the site, conducted a survey of UC-92, along with the other submarines. The wreck was positively identified, as UC-92 was the only one of the submarines brought to Falmouth to have been a mine-laying vessel, and her six mine tubes were identified among the surviving wreck features. The lower parts of the vessel remain on the seabed just off shore, with parts of the structure breaking the surface during low water springs. Along with the remains of the other submarines brought to the bay, the site is a popular attraction for local divers.

References

Notes

Citations

Bibliography

 
 

Ships built in Hamburg
German Type UC III submarines
U-boats commissioned in 1918
World War I submarines of Germany
World War I minelayers of Germany
1918 ships